Mountains of the Moon is a 1990 American biographical film depicting the 1857–1858 journey of Richard Francis Burton and John Hanning Speke in their expedition to Central Africa, which culminated in Speke's discovery of the source of the Nile River and led to a bitter rivalry between the two men. The film stars Patrick Bergin as Burton and Iain Glen as Speke. Delroy Lindo appears as an African whom the explorers meet.

The film was directed by Bob Rafelson based on the 1982 novel Burton and Speke by William Harrison.

Cast
 Patrick Bergin as Richard Francis Burton
 Iain Glen as John Hanning Speke
 Richard E. Grant as Larry Oliphant
 Fiona Shaw as Isabel Arundell
 John Savident as Lord Murchison
 James Villiers as Lord Oliphant
 Adrian Rawlins as Edward
 Peter Vaughan as Lord Houghton
 Delroy Lindo as Mabruki
 Paul Onsongo as Sidi Bombay
 Bheki Tonto Ngema as King Ngola
 Martin Okello as Veldu
 Bernard Hill as David Livingstone
 Matthew Marsh as William
 Richard Caldicot as Lord John Russell
 Christopher Fulford as Herne
 Garry Cooper as Stroyan
 Roshan Seth as Ben Amir
 Anna Massey as Mrs. Arundell
 Omar Sharif as Sultan (unbilled)

Music 
The original music was composed by Michael Small, who incorporated genuine traditional African music into a traditional orchestral palette. The soundtrack album was released on Polydor Records, but is long out of print. There are two major themes, one for Burton and the other for Africa.  There is also a love theme for Burton's relationship to his wife Isabel Burton (portrayed in the movie by Fiona Shaw).

Availability 
The film was released in a pan and scan VHS edition from a widescreen laserdisc and is currently available as both a pan and scan and widescreen DVD.

Reception
Peter Travers described Mountains as "an epic of sweep and intimacy", and Siskel & Ebert gave it two thumbs up. Ebert wrote, "It's the kind of movie that sends you away from the screen filled with curiosity to know more about this man Burton." In Newsweek, critic Jack Kroll wrote, "The exploits of Sir Richard Francis Burton make Lawrence of Arabia look like a tourist." Mountains of the Moon holds a rating of 65% on Rotten Tomatoes based on 17 reviews.

References

Bibliography
Edward Rice, Captain Sir Richard Francis Burton: A Biography, Da Capo Press (June 5, 2001)
Mary S. Lovell, A Rage to Live: A Biography of Richard and Isabel Burton, Norton & Company (1998)

External links 
 
 
 
 
 
 
 Mountains of the Moon: The greatest river in the world Movie clip at Jinni

1990 films
1990s adventure drama films
1990s biographical drama films
American adventure drama films
American biographical drama films
Films set in Tanzania
Adventure films based on actual events
American epic films
Films directed by Bob Rafelson
Films with screenplays by Bob Rafelson
Films scored by Michael Small
Films set in 1857
TriStar Pictures films
Carolco Pictures films
Cultural depictions of David Livingstone
Films set in pre-colonial sub-Saharan Africa
1990 drama films
1990s English-language films
1990s American films
Epic films based on actual events